An organic unit is a military unit that is a permanent part of a larger unit and (usually) provides some specialized capability to that parent unit. For instance, the US Marine Corps incorporates its own aviation units (distinct from the US Air Force and US Navy) that provide it with fire support, electronic warfare, and transport.

Description
At a lower level of organization, infantry units commonly incorporate organic armour or artillery units to improve their combined arms capability. Organic assets are closely integrated into their parent unit's command structure and their personnel are familiar with other personnel in the parent unit, improving coordination and responsiveness and making the parent unit more self-sufficient.

However, over-emphasis of organic assets can create wasteful redundancy. For instance, an infantry unit assigned to urban peacekeeping duties might have little use for its organic artillery, while another unit deployed elsewhere might have less artillery support than it required. The question of how much to emphasise the use of organic assets, as opposed to coordination with separate units ("joint organization") is a subject of debate and heavily dependent on questions of command and control.

References

Military units and formations by type